The gray spiny mouse  (Acomys cineraceus) is a species of rodent in the family Muridae found in Ethiopia, Kenya, South Sudan, and Uganda. Its natural habitats are dry savanna, moist savanna, rocky areas, arable land, and rural gardens.

References

Acomys
Rodents of Africa
Mammals described in 1877
Taxonomy articles created by Polbot